In mathematics, the two-sided Laplace transform or bilateral Laplace transform is an integral transform equivalent to probability's moment generating function.  Two-sided Laplace transforms are closely related to the Fourier transform, the Mellin transform, the Z-transform and the ordinary or one-sided Laplace transform. If f(t) is a real- or complex-valued function of the real variable t defined for all real numbers, then the two-sided Laplace transform is defined by the integral

The integral is most commonly understood as an improper integral, which converges if and only if both integrals

exist.  There seems to be no generally accepted notation for the two-sided transform; the 
 used here recalls "bilateral". The two-sided transform
used by some authors is

In pure mathematics the argument t can be any variable, and Laplace transforms are used to study how differential operators transform the function.

In science and engineering applications, the argument t often represents time (in seconds), and the function f(t) often represents a signal or waveform that varies with time.  In these cases, the signals are transformed by filters, that work like a mathematical operator, but with a restriction. They have to be causal, which means that the output in a given time t cannot depend on an output which is a higher value of t.
In population ecology, the argument t often represents spatial displacement in a dispersal kernel.

When working with functions of time, f(t) is called the time domain representation of the signal, while F(s) is called the s-domain (or Laplace domain) representation. The inverse transformation then represents a synthesis of the signal as the sum of its frequency components taken over all frequencies, whereas the forward transformation represents the analysis of the signal into its frequency components.

Relationship to the Fourier transform
The Fourier transform can be defined in terms of the two-sided Laplace transform:

Note that definitions of the Fourier transform differ, and in particular

is often used instead. In terms of the Fourier transform, we may also obtain the two-sided Laplace transform, as

The Fourier transform is normally defined so that it exists for real values; the above definition defines the image in a strip  which may not include the real axis where the Fourier transform is supposed to converge.

This is then why Laplace transforms retain their value in control theory and signal processing: the convergence of a Fourier transform integral within its domain only means that a linear, shift-invariant system described by it is stable or critical. The Laplace one on the other hand will somewhere converge for every impulse response which is at most exponentially growing, because it involves an extra term which can be taken as an exponential regulator. Since there are no superexponentially growing linear feedback networks, Laplace transform based analysis and solution of linear, shift-invariant systems, takes its most general form in the context of Laplace, not Fourier, transforms.

At the same time, nowadays Laplace transform theory falls within the ambit of more general integral transforms, or even general harmonical analysis. In that framework and nomenclature, Laplace transforms are simply another form of Fourier analysis, even if more general in hindsight.

Relationship to other integral transforms
If u is the Heaviside step function, equal to zero when its argument is less than zero, to one-half when its argument equals zero, and to one when its argument is greater than zero, then the Laplace transform  may be defined in terms of the two-sided Laplace transform by

On the other hand, we also have

where  is the function that multiplies by minus one, so either version of the Laplace transform can be defined in terms of the other.

The Mellin transform may be defined in terms of the two-sided Laplace transform by

Properties

Most properties of the bilateral Laplace transform are very similar to properties of the unilateral Laplace transform,
but there are some important differences:

Parseval's theorem and Plancherel's theorem

Let  and  be functions with bilateral Laplace transforms
. 
Then Parseval's theorem holds:

This theorem is proved by applying the inverse Laplace transform on the convolution theorem in form of the cross-correlation.

Let  be a function with bilateral Laplace transform 
in the strip of convergence .
Then the Plancherel theorem holds:

Uniqueness

For any two functions  for which the two-sided Laplace transforms  exist, if  i.e.  for every value of  then  almost everywhere.

Region of convergence
Bilateral transform requirements for convergence are more difficult than for unilateral transforms. The region of convergence will be normally smaller.

If f is a locally integrable function (or more generally a Borel measure locally of bounded variation), then the Laplace transform F(s) of f converges provided that the limit
 
exists. The Laplace transform converges absolutely if the integral
 
exists (as a proper Lebesgue integral). The Laplace transform is usually understood as conditionally convergent, meaning that it converges in the former instead of the latter sense.

The set of values for which F(s) converges absolutely is either of the form Re(s) > a or else Re(s) ≥ a, where a is an extended real constant, −∞ ≤ a ≤ ∞.  (This follows from the dominated convergence theorem.) The constant a is known as the abscissa of absolute convergence, and depends on the growth behavior of f(t). Analogously, the two-sided transform converges absolutely in a strip of the form a < Re(s) < b, and possibly including the lines Re(s) = a or Re(s) = b. The subset of values of s for which the Laplace transform converges absolutely is called the region of absolute convergence or the domain of absolute convergence. In the two-sided case, it is sometimes called the strip of absolute convergence. The Laplace transform is analytic in the region of absolute convergence.

Similarly, the set of values for which F(s) converges (conditionally or absolutely) is known as the region of conditional convergence, or simply the region of convergence (ROC).  If the Laplace transform converges (conditionally) at s = s0, then it automatically converges for all s with Re(s) > Re(s0). Therefore, the region of convergence is a half-plane of the form Re(s) > a, possibly including some points of the boundary line Re(s) = a. In the region of convergence Re(s) > Re(s0), the Laplace transform of f can be expressed by integrating by parts as the integral

That is, in the region of convergence F(s) can effectively be expressed as the absolutely convergent Laplace transform of some other function. In particular, it is analytic.

There are several Paley–Wiener theorems concerning the relationship between the decay properties of f and the properties of the Laplace transform within the region of convergence.

In engineering applications, a function corresponding to a linear time-invariant (LTI) system is stable if every bounded input produces a bounded output.

Causality
Bilateral transforms do not respect causality. They make sense when applied over generic functions but when working with functions of time (signals) unilateral transforms are preferred.

Table of selected bilateral Laplace transforms 

Following list of interesting examples for the bilateral Laplace transform can be deduced from the corresponding Fourier or 
unilateral Laplace transformations
(see also ):

See also
Causal filter
Acausal system
Causal system
Sinc filter – ideal sinc filter (aka rectangular filter) is acausal and has an infinite delay.

References

Van der Pol, Balthasar, and Bremmer, H., Operational Calculus Based on the Two-Sided Laplace Integral, Chelsea Pub. Co., 3rd ed., 1987.
.

Integral transforms
Laplace transforms